Salakope is a community in the Ketu South District in the Volta Region of Ghana.

References 

Volta Region
Communities in Ghana